Party Fun Action Committee is an American hip hop group consisting of Blockhead and Jer.

History
Party Fun Action Committee released the first studio album, Let's Get Serious, on Definitive Jux in 2003. The album peaked at number 7 on the CMJ Hip-Hop chart. It received favorable reviews from AllMusic, The A.V. Club, and Stylus Magazine.

The group was featured on Aesop Rock's song "Cook It Up", which appeared on his 2003 album, Bazooka Tooth.

Discography
Studio albums
 Let's Get Serious (2003)

Singles
 "Beer" (2003)

Guest appearances
 Aesop Rock - "Cook It Up" from Bazooka Tooth (2003)

References

External links
 

Alternative hip hop groups
American hip hop groups
American musical duos
Definitive Jux artists